The Canton of Boves  is a former canton situated in the department of the Somme and in the former Picardy region of northern France. It was disbanded following the French canton reorganisation which came into effect in March 2015. It had 20,790 inhabitants (2012).

Geography 
The canton is organised around the commune of Boves in the arrondissement of Amiens. The altitude varies from 21m at Glisy to 137m at Saint-Sauflieu for an average of 73m.

The canton comprised 23 communes:

Blangy-Tronville
Boves
Cachy
Cottenchy
Dommartin
Dury
Estrées-sur-Noye
Fouencamps
Gentelles
Glisy
Grattepanche
Guyencourt-sur-Noye
Hailles
Hébécourt
Remiencourt
Rumigny
Sains-en-Amiénois
Saint-Fuscien
Saint-Sauflieu
Saleux
Salouël
Thézy-Glimont
Vers-sur-Selles

Population

See also
 Arrondissements of the Somme department
 Cantons of the Somme department
 Communes of the Somme department

References

Boves
2015 disestablishments in France
States and territories disestablished in 2015